Vojkan Krgović (born August 17, 1967) is a Serbian professional basketball coach and former player.

Awards 
 Kosovo and Metochia Sportsperson of the Year (1993)

References

External links
 Coach Profile at treneri.me
 Player Profile at fibaeurope.com
 Player Profile at eurobasket.com

1967 births
Living people
KK Crvena zvezda players
KK Vojvodina players
KK Mornar Bar players
KK Napredak Kruševac players
Montenegrin basketball coaches
Serbian men's basketball coaches
Serbian men's basketball players
Serbian expatriate basketball people in Slovenia
Serbian expatriate basketball people in Montenegro
Serbian expatriate basketball people in North Macedonia
Sportspeople from Peja
Centers (basketball)
Kosovo Serbs